William Irvin Troutman (January 13, 1905 – January 27, 1971) was a Republican U.S. Representative from Pennsylvania.

Biography
Troutman was born in Shamokin, Northumberland County, Pennsylvania, he attended Franklin & Marshall College in Lancaster, Pennsylvania where he was a member of the Phi Beta Kappa and Sigma Pi Fraternities.  After graduating in 1927, he attended the University of Pennsylvania Law School, Philadelphia, Pennsylvania, earning his law degree in 1930. He was admitted to the bar in 1930, practicing law in his hometown of Shamokin, Pennsylvania.

He was elected to Congress in 1942 as an at-large member and served until his resignation on January 2, 1945. In addition to his service in the United States House of Representatives, he was also member of the Pennsylvania State Senate, Judge of the Court of Common Pleas of Northumberland County and the Court of Common Pleas in Philadelphia.  Troutman died in Shamokin, Pennsylvania, and is interned at the Odd Fellows Cemetery.

References

Sources

The Political Graveyard

University of Pennsylvania Law School alumni
Republican Party Pennsylvania state senators
Pennsylvania lawyers
1971 deaths
1905 births
Franklin & Marshall College alumni
Republican Party members of the United States House of Representatives from Pennsylvania
20th-century American politicians
20th-century American judges
20th-century American lawyers
Judges of the Pennsylvania Courts of Common Pleas